Queer Eye is a television franchise based upon a team of gay professionals (the "Fab 5") giving lifestyle and fashion makeovers to guests.

Queer Eye may refer to:

 Queer Eye (2003 TV series), an American reality television series on Bravo, known originally as Queer Eye for the Straight Guy
 Queer Eye for the Straight Girl (2005), a women-focused spin-off of the 2003 series
 One of a number of international adaptations of Queer Eye:
 Aussie Queer Eye for the Straight Guy (Australia)
 FAB 5 (Greece)
 Queer Eye (2018 TV series), a Netflix reboot series

See also
 Queer Eyes, Full Hearts, a 2014 episode of Modern Family